YEN.com.gh is a Ghanaian online news publication created in September 2015. It covers local and international news, politics, business, entertainment, technology, sport news and users’ generated news content.

History 
YEN.com.gh was founded in 2015. It is a partner of Genesis Media an internet company which also cooperates with Tuko (in Kenya) and Legit.ng (in Nigeria). It has its headquarters in Accra and covers local and international news, politics, business, entertainment, technology, sport news and users' generated news content. It has presence in web, social media and mobile platforms, particularly on Android.

Rankings 
According to Alexa Top Sites rankings by country, Yen.com.gh ranks thirteen in Ghana and is very popular among Ghanaian and people in the United States, United Kingdom, Canada, Italy, South Africa, Netherlands, France and many other countries.

Meaning of name
Yen, translated from Twi, a dialect of the Akan language, means "us" or "we" and "our" in the language.

Features
Yen publishes news, business, entertainment and user-generated content. Its first editor-in-chief was Ameyaw Debrah who served from September 2015 to September 2017.

References

External links
Official Website
Ghana Internet

Ghanaian news websites
Internet properties established in 2015
2015 establishments in Ghana